"Adore" is a song recorded by Norwegian DJ and record producer Cashmere Cat, featuring vocals by American singer Ariana Grande. It was written and produced by Cashmere along with Benny Blanco and Lido, and co-written by Ammar Malik, Jeremih Felton, Kenneth "Babyface" Edmonds and Darryl Simmons. "Adore" was digitally released on March 3, 2015 by Friends Keep Secrets and Interscope Records.

Background and composition
"Adore" is the second collaboration between Cashmere Cat and Grande, the first being the song "Be My Baby", from Grande's second studio album, My Everything (2014). The song features a heavy dose of breathy, falsetto vocals, atmospheric elements, subtle dance beats and punches of clattering percussion, and a vocal interpolation of Johnny Gill's classic R&B hit "My, My, My".

Live performances
The song was first presented on Grande's The Honeymoon Tour where Cashmere Cat performed the song with Grande during his opening act.

Critical reception
USA Today ranked the song as one of the 50 best in 2015, writing, "Grande’s towering vocals have never sounded better than on this offbeat R&B track."

Charts performance
Commercially, the song peaked at number 93 on the US Billboard Hot 100, becoming Cashmere Cat's first appearance on that chart.

References

External links 
 Cashmere Cat at SoundCloud

2015 songs
2015 singles
Ariana Grande songs
Interscope Records singles
Norwegian electronic songs
Songs written by Benny Blanco
Songs written by Ammar Malik
Songs written by Babyface (musician)
Songs written by Daryl Simmons
Songs written by Jeremih
Song recordings produced by Benny Blanco
Song recordings produced by Cashmere Cat
Torch songs
Songs written by Cashmere Cat
Cashmere Cat songs
Songs written by Lido (musician)